Klein Aub is a village in the Rehoboth Rural constituency in the Hardap Region of central Namibia. Situated on the junction of the unpaved roads C14 and D1290 it contains a store and two schools.

Klein Aub used to be the place of a copper mine from 1964 to 1987, also gold and silver have been found in the area. In early 2010 one of the mining tunnels collapsed, leaving a 50m deep hole.

Climate

References

Populated places in the Hardap Region